Gyongyver Villő Kormos (born 2 August 1988) is a Hungarian diver.

Career
At age sixteen, Kormos became one of the youngest divers to compete at the 2004 Summer Olympics in Athens. She placed thirty-second in the preliminary rounds of the women's springboard event, with a score of 193.68.

At the 2008 Summer Olympics in Beijing, Kormos competed for the second time in women's springboard event, along with her compatriot Nóra Barta. She placed twenty-fourth in the preliminary rounds of the competition, with a score of 247.95.

Kormos is a full-time member of Rugóláb Lendület SE in Budapest, being coached and trained by Katalin Haász.

She announced her retirement on March 8, 2018.

References

External links
NBC 2008 Olympics profile

Hungarian female divers
Living people
Olympic divers of Hungary
Divers at the 2004 Summer Olympics
Divers at the 2008 Summer Olympics
Divers at the 2016 Summer Olympics
Divers from Budapest
1988 births
Sportspeople from Budapest